Catharine Dixon (born 1927) is a Canadian journalist and author of non-fiction books.

A resident of Elliot Lake, Ontario for almost fifty years, in the 1970s, Dixon worked as a reporter for the Sault Star newspaper in Sault Ste. Marie. The author of several short stories, her 1996 book The Power and the Promise is a historical reference for the city of Elliot Lake. She currently lives in Barrie, Ontario.

Bibliography
 The Power and the Promise  (1996)
 As it Happened  (2001)

External links
 Catharine Dixon book referencing website
 Catharine Dixon fonds at Laurentian University.

1927 births
Living people
Canadian women journalists
Canadian non-fiction writers
Journalists from Ontario
Writers from Ontario
People from Elliot Lake
Canadian women short story writers
20th-century Canadian short story writers
20th-century Canadian women writers
Canadian women non-fiction writers